Elections to the French National Assembly were held in French Dahomey on 2 January 1956. The territory elected two seats to the Assembly, which were won by Sourou-Migan Apithy of the Republican Party of Dahomey and Hubert Maga of the Ethnic Group of the North. Voter turnout was 47.4%.

Results

References

Elections in Benin
Dahomey
1956 in French Dahomey
Legislative elections in France